Lone Mountain is a neighborhood in Las Vegas, Nevada.

 The area was named after a solitary hill that is detached from the Red Rock National Conservation Area, known as "Lone Mountain", which is an isolated, rocky butte northwest of central Las Vegas. The summit stands 560 feet above the surrounding area, giving great views of the city, the Spring Mountains, and Mt. Charleston. Lone Mountain itself is encircled by a 10-foot-wide, 3.2-mile perimeter trail for joggers, hikers, and horseback riders.

It is the neighboring community immediately north of Summerlin and roughly bordered on the west by the Red Rock Canyon National Conservation Area, on the south by Cheyenne Avenue, on the east by the [U.S. Route 215 [Bruce Woodbury Beltway] and on the north by West Lone Mountain Road. Within this area are some of the most desirable homes in Las Vegas. While there is a proliferation of affluent new construction at the western foothills, there are still a number of horse ranches and natural terrain and parks which remain.

The Las Vegas Metropolitan Police Department's Academy is located within Lone Mountain, as is the adjacent Police Memorial Park (dedicated in 2009). The park includes the Memorial Wall and two dedicated tree groves to memorialize Las Vegas Metropolitan police officers who have died in the line of duty. Two trees are dedicated to the Ten-13 retired New York Police Officers of the September 11, 2001 tragedy. The area enjoys a low crime rate, perhaps because of the numerous law enforcement officers and their families who reside in this community.

There is an abundance of recreational areas within the area, including Lone Mountain Discovery Park, which is a green space with a roller hockey rink, basketball, tennis courts, and a picnic area. Majestic Park, a full-service softball facility with 12 playing fields. Trigono Hills Park, a 6.5 million dollar recreational facility, which opened in the spring of 2020 and is located Cliff Shadows Parkway at Gilmore Avenue.

The homes of Lone Mountain range from the Spanish Colonial horse ranches, to luxury "mini-estates" by Blue Heron Homes, to the 3-story, mid-century modern revival homes at "Hillside", designed by William Ramsey.

References

External links
 

Las Vegas Valley
Unincorporated communities in Clark County, Nevada
Unincorporated communities in Nevada